Calonarius xanthodryophilus is a species of fungus in the family Cortinariaceae.

Taxonomy 
The species was described in 2011 by the mycologists Dimitar Bojantchev and R. Michael Davis who classified it as Cortinarius xanthodryophilus.

In 2022 the species was transferred from Cortinarius and reclassified as Calonarius xanthodryophilus based on genomic data.

Description 
The gills are notched, crowded, yellow then brown as the spores mature. The stalk is 5–10 cm tall and 1.5–3 cm wide, club-shaped, and sometimes tinted blue.

It should not be consumed due to its similarity to deadly poisonous species.

Habitat and distribution 
It is native to North America.

See also
List of Cortinarius species

References

External links

xanthodryophilus
Fungi of North America
Fungi described in 2011